The 2008–09 Big Ten Conference men's basketball season marked the continuation of the annual tradition of competitive basketball among Big Ten Conference members that began in 1904.  It was the 104th season of Big Ten Conference basketball play.  Although during the 2008-09 NCAA Division I men's basketball season there were no Big Ten players named to any All-American teams, no coaches given any national coaching honors, and no teams that won any major preconference tournament, the season was successful for other reasons.  The conference had an overall 14–8 record in postseason play with one team reaching for the 2009 NCAA Men's Division I Basketball Tournament championship game and another winning the championship of the 2009 National Invitation Tournament (NIT).

The season marked the second year that all regular season and Big Ten Conference men's basketball tournament games were nationally televised. It was the first season that eight member teams achieved 20 wins. During the season, the conference achieved a .781 winning percentage against non-conference opponents, which is the highest percentage since 1998–99.

Michigan State was the regular season champion winning the league four games. Purdue and Illinois tied for second place. Michigan State's Kalin Lucas was named Big Ten Player of the Year. Michigan State's Tom Izzo was named Coach of the Year by the coaches while Penn State's Ed Dechellis was named Coach of the Year by the media.

Purdue won the Big Ten tournament by defeating Ohio State in the championship. As a result of its win, Purdue received the conference's automatic bid to the NCAA tournament. In total, seven teams received bids to the NCAA tournament: Michigan State, Purdue, Illinois, Ohio State, Michigan, Minnesota, and Wisconsin. By placing 7 of its 11 teams in the tournament, it had 64% of its teams in the tournament, which outpaced all other conferences. Both Michigan State and Purdue advanced to the second weekend's Sweet Sixteen round, where Purdue lost to Connecticut. Michigan State advanced to the championship game where it lost to North Carolina 89–72.

The Big Ten also had two entrants in the 2009 NIT: Penn State and Northwestern with Penn State winning the tournament.

Preseason

All-Big Ten players
On October 26, the Big Ten media selected Purdue as the preseason top team.  It selected Michigan State and Wisconsin as second and third respectively.  However, the November 10 national AP Poll and Coaches' Poll ranked Michigan State as the highest among Big Ten teams with Purdue second and Wisconsin third in their respective preseason  2008–09 NCAA Division I men's basketball rankings.

The media also made preseason All-Big Ten player selections: Manny Harris, sophomore guard from Michigan, Raymar Morgan, junior forward from Michigan State, Marcus Landry, senior forward from Wisconsin, E'Twaun Moore, sophomore guard from Purdue, and Robbie Hummel, sophomore forward from Purdue, who was named Preseason Player of the Year.

The Los Angeles Athletic Club released its annual preseason John R. Wooden Award watch list on November 13. The list was composed of 50 student athletes who, based on 2007–08's individual performance and team records, were the early frontrunners for college basketball's most coveted trophy. These top 50 candidates were returning players. Transfers, freshmen, and medical red-shirts were not eligible for this preseason list, but were evaluated and considered for both the Midseason Top 30 list and the National Ballot. The Big Ten was represented by Purdue's Hummel, Wisconsin's Landry and Michigan State's Morgan.

On December 18, the Atlanta Tipoff Club released its annual early season Naismith College Player of the Year award watch list.  The top-50 list included Hummel, Moore and Morgan. The watch list does not include incoming freshmen, although those student-athletes were considered in the February 2009 mid season vote.

Regular season
November
The Big Ten began the season anticipating competitive schedules since the conference had scheduled appearances against thirteen of the teams appearing in both of the major pre-season rankings.  The conference opened its first week with a 14–0 record, while holding all 14 opponents to 65 points or less.  By the end of the second week of the season the Big Ten found itself with the best non-conference record in the nation at 35–1. They became the first power conference (ACC, Big 12, Big East, Big Ten, Pac-10 or SEC) to have a road win against another of the conferences when Illinois bested Vanderbilt on November 20.  On the same date, Michigan achieved the conference's first victory against a top five opponent since Michigan State upended Texas on December 22, 2007. Big Ten teams did not win any of the larger preconference tournaments: Purdue lost in overtime of the November 28 championship game of the 16-team 2008 NIT Season Tip-Off tournament, Michigan placed second in the 16-team 2K Sports Classic benefiting Coaches vs. Cancer tournament on November 21, and Wisconsin was runner up in the 8-team Paradise Jam Tournament on November 24. Minnesota, was successful in the 4-team National Association of Basketball Coaches Classic with a win over Georgia State Panthers in the championship game.

December
On Wednesday, December 3, The Big Ten lost to the Atlantic Coast Conference  for the 10th consecutive year in the ACC–Big Ten Challenge.  The final margin was 6–5. By the end of the fourth week of the season in early December, the Big Ten had the highest percentage of teams receiving votes in the Associated Press National Rankings and had the highest non-conference strength of schedule in the Ratings Percentage Index (RPI).  Minnesota's 8–0 start was Tubby Smith's first.  After five weeks, the Big Ten had the maintained its AP rankings leadership, but also took over the overall leadership in the RPI ratings.  The conference's 82–19 record included only losses to teams that had advanced to the post-season the year before.  Michigan State's win against Texas gave the Big Ten half of the nation's first six victories over top five teams.  National Invitation Tournament defending champion, Ohio State's eighth victory gave them the nation's longest win streak at thirteen.  Entering conference play, at 12–0 Minnesota remained one of the nine unbeaten teams in the nation, which was its best start since 1948–49. The conference had one of three winning conference records on the road against non-conference opponents at 10–8 and with 5 of its 11 teams ranked in the AP poll, it had the highest percentage of its teams ranked.

January
For the first time since freshmen became eligible in 1974, Indiana started four freshmen in a conference opener on January 3 against Iowa. On January 11, Minnesota tied an NCAA record and set a conference record by making all nine of its three-point field goals. Illinois' January 14 victory over Michigan made it the thirteenth team in NCAA Division I history and second (after Indiana) in the Big Ten to achieve 1600 wins. On January 21, Northwestern snapped the third-longest home-court winning streak in the nation when it stopped Michigan State from earning its 29th straight home victory.  John Beilein recorded his 500th win as head coach of a four-year school and 575th win overall on January 24 against Northwestern. As January ended, the conference enjoyed its fourth consecutive week as the leader in the RPI strength of schedule. On January 31, Matt Roth became the first Indiana Hoosier, first Big Ten freshman and third Big Ten player to record nine three-point shots in a single game.

February
At the midpoint of the conference schedule at the beginning of February, the Big Ten had the highest Sagarin Rating central mean score.  Previously, Michigan State had never won its first five conference road games since joining the Big Ten for the 1950–51 season, but during the season, they were one of the last two teams to be undefeated on the road at 7–0. Tubby Smith became the third coach in NCAA history to record 20 wins during 16 consecutive seasons.  Through its 166th contest, the Big Ten, which had led the nation in average attendance for the prior 32 years, surpassed two million in attendance for the sixteenth consecutive season and eighteenth overall.

Attendance
The big ten concluded the season with the highest attendance in the nation for the 33rd straight season with an average attendance of 12,519 fans per game/session, including regular-season games and conference tournament sessions.  This surpassed the SEC, which was second with an 11,625 average.  The Big Ten held seven of the top 25 places among individual institutions, while no other conference had more than four individual schools among the top 25.

Rankings

^Final Poll = ESPN/USA Today Coaches Poll

Preconference schedules

Tournaments
No Big Ten teams won any major early conference tournaments.

ACC–Big Ten Challenge

In-season honors
Players of the week
Throughout the conference regular season, the Big Ten offices named a player of the week each Monday.

Midseason watch lists
On February 5, the Big Ten became one of six conferences to have multiple players selected as John R. Wooden Award 2008–09 Midseason Top 30 Candidates.  Both Manny Harris and Kalin Lucas were chosen.  On February 24, Hummel became the only Big Ten player included in the Naismith midseason Top 30. On February 26, Turner became the only Big Ten player selected by the U.S. Basketball Writers Association as a Top 15 finalist for the Oscar Robertson Trophy.

Conference honors
Two sets of conference award winners were recognized by the Big Ten - one selected by league coaches and one selected by the media.

All-Big Ten Academic team
The Big Ten Conference had 40 men's basketball letterwinners who were in at least their second academic year at their institution and who maintained a cumulative grade point average (GPA) of 3.0 or higher during the winter semester to earn Big Ten Academic All-Conference honors.  Northwestern's Sterling Williams who was a graduate student with a Communication Studies major had a perfect Winter GPA.  These student-athletes were eligible to be named Distinguished Scholar Awardees if they maintained a 3.7 GPA for the entire academic year.

National awards and honors

National awards
On March 22, the Big Ten had no players among the four finalists named for the Naismith award to be announced on April 5. On March 12, Lucas was among the 25 finalists for the Wooden Award to be named on April 10.

NABC
The National Association of Basketball Coaches announced their Division I All-District teams on March 5, recognizing the nation's best men's collegiate basketball student-athletes. Selected and voted on by member coaches of the NABC, 240 student-athletes, from 24 districts were chosen. The selection on this list were then eligible for the State Farm Coaches' Division I All-America teams announced at the 2009 NABC Convention in Detroit. The following list represented the Big Ten players chosen to the list. All Big Ten schools are within District 7 for the 2008–09 season.

First Team
Kalin Lucas Michigan State
Evan Turner Ohio State
Talor Battle Penn. State
Manny Harris Michigan
JaJuan Johnson Purdue
Second Team
Kevin Coble Northwestern
Demetri McCamey Illinois
Jamelle Cornley Penn. State
Goran Suton Michigan State
Mike Tisdale Illinois

USBWA
On March 10, the U.S. Basketball Writers Association released its 2008–09 Men's All-District Teams, based on voting from its national membership. There were nine regions from coast to coast and a player and coach of the year were selected in each. The following enumerates all the Big Ten players selected within their respective regions.

District II (NY, NJ, DE, DC, PA, WV)
All-District Team
Talor Battle, Penn State
District V (OH, IN, IL, MI, MN, WI)
All-District Team
Mike Davis, Illinois
Manny Harris, Michigan
JaJuan Johnson, Purdue
Kalin Lucas, Michigan State
Robbie Hummel, Purdue
Evan Turner, Ohio State
District VI (IA, MO, KS, OK, NE, ND, SD)
None Selected

Academic honors

CoSIDA
On February 5, 2009, the College Sports Information Directors of America (CoSIDA) and ESPN the Magazine selected their Academic All-Americans from throughout college basketball. CoSIDA has selected Academic All American teams since 1952. To be nominated, a student-athlete must be a starter or important reserve with at least a 3.30 cumulative grade point average (on a 4.0 scale) at his/her current institution. Nominated athletes must have participated in at least 50 percent of the team's games at the position listed on the nomination form (where applicable). No student-athlete is eligible until he has completed one full calendar year at his current institution and has reached sophomore athletic eligibility. In the cases of transfers, graduate students and two-year college graduates, the student-athlete must have completed one full calendar year at the nominating institution to be eligible. Nominees in graduate school must have a cumulative GPA of 3.30 or better both as an undergrad and in grad school. Penn State's Danny Morrissey was a District 2 first-team 2009 Academic All-District Men's Basketball Team selection.  On February 25, 2009, the Big Ten had no Academic All America Men's Basketball Team selections.

Big Ten Distinguished Scholar Award
At the conclusion of the 2008–09 academic year, the inaugural class of Big Ten Distinguished Scholars were recognized for having attained a 3.7 GPA for the academic year while earning varsity letters.  Brett Finkelmeier, IND, Jamal Abu-Shamala, MINN, Sterling Williams, NU, and Mark Wohlford, PUR represented men's basketball as awardees.

All-American

Lucas and Turner were Associated Press All-American honorable mentions.

Summer play
Battle, Hummel, and Turner were selected to represent the United States in the 2009 World University Games July 2–11 in Belgrade, Serbia. John Shurna was named to the United States' team for the 2009 FIBA Under-19 World championship held July 2–12 in Auckland, New Zealand.

NBA Draft
During the 2009 NBA Draft, Mullens was chosen in the first round with the 24th overall selection by the Dallas Mavericks and Suton was selected by the Utah Jazz in the second round with the 50th overall selection.

Coaching honors
Wisconsin head basketball coach, Bo Ryan, was chosen to be the head coach for the 2009 World University Games Team by USA Basketball. Purdue head basketball coach, Matt Painter, was chosen to be one of two assistant coaches for the 2009 FIBA Under-19 World championship Team by USA Basketball.  Painter was one of ten finalists for the 2009 Henry Iba Award as named by the U.S. Basketball Writers Association. Forbes named Ryan and Tom Izzo as two of the top ten coaches.

Statistical leaders
Eight of the eleven member Big Ten institutions will return at least 75 percent of their offensive production during the 2009–10 Big Ten Conference men's basketball season, unless underclassmen declare for the 2009 NBA Draft. Indiana, Iowa, Michigan, Minnesota and Ohio State will return 90 percent of their total offensive production. The Buckeyes could return 100 percent of their scoring contingent next season. All five first-team All-Conference honorees were sophomores and are all projected to return as juniors. Overall, the Big Ten could return 80.5 percent of its offensive production from 2008 to 2009, and no team should lose more than half of its total scoring unit next year.

Min. 5 FGM/Gm.

Min 1.5 3Pt FGM/Gm.

Min 2.5 FTM/Gm.

Players must have played in 75% of team's games to be eligible.
(NCAA-wide ranking) in parenthesis for top 40 performers

Team statistics

Source: Fox Sports

Postseason

Big Ten tournament

#3 Purdue defeated #5 Ohio State in the 2009 Big Ten Conference men's basketball tournament championship game by a 65–61 margin. The All-Big Ten tournament team honorees were Boilermakers Robbie Hummel (Most Outstanding Player), JaJuan Johnson and E'Twaun Moore, Buckeye Evan Turner and Mike Davis of Illinois.

Schedule

NCAA tournament

Goran Suton was the Midwest regional most outstanding player. He was joined by teammates Kalin Lucas and Travis Walton on the NCAA tournament All-Midwest Regional team.  Michigan State became the first team to play in the Final Four in their home state since Duke in 1994 and the first Big Ten team since Purdue in 1980.  They were also the team with the second shortest trip to the Final Four since it was bracketed in 1985.

National Invitation tournament

Jamelle Cornley was the most outstanding player of the tournament.

Other tournaments

The Big Ten did not have any entrants in the other post season tournaments.

2009 NBA Draft

Several All Big Ten players who completed their eligibility were not drafted. Among those, Marcus Landry made it to the NBA the following season nonetheless.  The following players were selected in the 2009 NBA Draft

Pre-draft trades
 On June 24, 2009, Portland acquired the 22nd pick from Dallas in exchange for the 24th pick, 56th pick and a 2010 second-round draft pick. Portland used the 22nd pick to draft Víctor Claver and Dallas used the 24th and 56th pick to draft Byron Mullens and Ahmad Nivins respectively.

Draft-day trades
The following trades involving drafted players were made on the day of the draft.
 Oklahoma City acquired the draft rights to 24th pick Byron Mullens from Dallas in exchange for the draft rights to 25th pick Rodrigue Beaubois and a future second-round draft pick.

See also
2008–09 NCAA Division I men's basketball season
2009 Big Ten Conference men's basketball tournament

Notes